Heinrich Andreas Otto Tiemann (12 February 1890  – 20 April 1952) was a German general during World War II who commanded several corps.  He was a recipient of the Knight's Cross of the Iron Cross.

Promotions
 3. or 8.3.1908 Fahnenjunker
17.8.1909 Leutnant mit Patent vom 17.8.1907 
27.1.1915 Oberleutnant 
28.12.1916 Hauptmann 
 1.2.1922 neues Rangdienstalter (RDA) vom 28.12.1916 erhalten
1.2.1930 Major mit RDA vom 01.02.1928 
1.4.1932 Oberstleutnant 
1.6.1934 Oberst 
1.10.1937 Generalmajor
1.10.1939 Generalleutnant 
1.5.1944 General der Pioniere

Awards
 Iron Cross (1914) 2nd Class & 1st Class
 Wound Badge (1918) in Black
 The Honour Cross of the World War 1914/1918 with swords
 Wehrmacht Long Service Award, 4th to 1st class
 Iron Cross (1939) 2nd Class & 1st Class
 Eastern Front Medal (26 July 1942)
 German Cross in Gold (19 December 1941)
 Knight's Cross of the Iron Cross on  28 April 1943 as Generalleutnant and commander of 93. Infanterie-Division

References

Citations

Bibliography

 

1890 births
1952 deaths
People from Diepholz (district)
German Army generals of World War II
Generals of Engineers
German Army personnel of World War I
Recipients of the clasp to the Iron Cross, 1st class
Recipients of the Gold German Cross
Recipients of the Knight's Cross of the Iron Cross
People from the Province of Hanover
Military personnel from Lower Saxony